Christoph Bertram (born 3 September 1937) is a German journalist who is the director of the German Institute for International and Security Affairs. He was director of the International Institute for Strategic Studies from 1974 to 1982. He worked for the German-language weekly Die Zeit for sixteen years as head of a department and as a diplomatic correspondent. He was a member of the editorial board of Foreign Policy magazine. From 1980 to 1981 and from 1990 to 1993 he was a member of the steering committee of the Bilderberg meetings.

References

External links
"German Foreign Policy with Christoph Bertram". American Institute for Contemporary German Studies. May 19, 2015. via YouTube.

1937 births
Writers from Kiel
German journalists
Living people
Commanders Crosses of the Order of Merit of the Federal Republic of Germany